John Bernhard Johnson (February 4, 1885 – May 18, 1985) was an American politician. He served in the South Dakota State Senate from 1923 to 1926.

References

1885 births
1985 deaths
American centenarians
Men centenarians
People from Beresford, South Dakota
Democratic Party South Dakota state senators
20th-century American politicians